Gavin Kirk may refer to:

 Gavin Kirk (ice hockey) (born 1951), ice hockey player
 Gavin Kirk (priest) (born 1961), British Anglican priest